The Bangsar–Petaling Jaya Bypass or Lebuhraya Pintasan Bangsar-Petaling Jaya is a major highway in Kuala Lumpur city, Malaysia. The highway passing Mid Valley City from Bangsar to Federal Highway. This highway is maintained by the Kuala Lumpur City Hall or Dewan Bandaraya Kuala Lumpur (DBKL).

List of interchanges

Highways in Malaysia
Expressways and highways in the Klang Valley
Roads in Kuala Lumpur